Caurapañcāśikā or The Love thief, by Bilhana, is an Indian love poem.

Background
According to legend, the Brahman Bilhana fell in love with the daughter of King Madanabhirama, Princess Yaminipurnatilaka, and had a secretive love affair. They were discovered, and Bilhana was thrown into prison. While awaiting judgement, he wrote the Caurapâñcâśikâ, a fifty-stanza love poem, not knowing whether he would be sent into exile or die on the gallows. It is unknown what fate Bilhana encountered. Nevertheless, his poem was transmitted orally around India. There are several versions, including ones from South India which had a happy ending; the Kashmiri version does not specify what the outcome was.

Editions and versions
In the nineteenth century the Caurapañcāśikā was 'discovered' by Europeans. The first French edition, published in the Journal Asiatique of 1848, was based on one of the South Indian versions with a happy ending. Sir Edwin Arnold did very loose translation with Tennyson-like cadences (London 1896); A. B. Keith provided a literal translation; Gertrude Cloris Schwebell,  working from translations by S. N. Tadpatrikar, M. Ariel and Gerhard Gollwitzer, created a free verse rendering. However, the version best known to English readers is probably that by Barbara Stoler Miller; or the 'free interpretation' by Edward Powys Mathers (also known as E. Powys Mathers) entitled Black Marigolds. There is a 2000 translation, possibly privately printed, by John T. Roberts. Also there is the Love Lyrics / by Amaru [and] Bhartṛhari ; translated by Greg Bailey ; & by Bilhaṇa ; edited and translated by Richard Gombrich published by The Clay Sanskrit Library in 2005. Dawn Corrigan has done an adaptation/rendition of the Caurapañcāśikā "Swan Song of the Thief" a free interpretation in 2013. There is also a 2013 translation The Caurapâñcâśikâ (The Love-Thief) Poetic rendering into English 2013.

Appearances in modern literature 
Several stanzas of E. Powys Mathers' "Black Marigolds" translation of Caurapâñcâśikâ appear in the novel Cannery Row by John Steinbeck. Author Victor Robert Lee  credits E. Powys Mathers' "Black Marigolds" as the source of the phrase "savoring of the hot taste of life" in his novel Performance Anomalies, and uses Mathers' repetition of the phrase "Even now" from "Black Marigolds" as an element in lyrics spoken by Cono 7Q, the protagonist of Performance Anomalies.

References

The Caurapâñcâśikâ (The Love-Thief) Poesy rendering into English 2013

Translations
Tchorapantchçat, publié, traduit et commenté par M. Ariel. Les Cinquantes (Couplets) de TCHORA ou Histoire de Bilhana; Journal Asiatique, Quatrième Serie, Tome XI, p. 469-534; Paris, 1848.
Sir Edwin Arnold (London 1896)
Pierre Rolland "les cinquante stances du voleur", Université de Provence, 1971
Black Marigolds: A free interpretation of the Caurapañcáziká. E. Powys Mathers, pp. 66–77 in Mark Van Doren (Ed.) An Anthology of World Poetry (Albert and Charles Boni, 1928). Also reissued as Black Marigolds and Coloured Stars. Edward Powys Mathers (Anvil Press Poetry, 2004)
Caurapañcáziká, an Indian Love Lament of Bilhana Kavi, critically edited with translation and notes by S. N. Tadpatrikar, Poona, 1946. Poona Oriental Series No. 86.
German Free Version of Gerhard Gollwitzer. Des Pandit Bilhana Fünfzig Strophen von Heimlicher Liebeslust, Karl Schustek Verlag, Hanau, 2 Aufl. 1964.
Gertrude Clorius Schwebel, The Secret Delights of Love by the pundit Bilhana (from the Sanskrit). (The Peter Pauper Press, 1966).
A. B. Keith, A History of Sanskrit Literature (Motilal Banarsidass, 1993), 153-158
Miller, Barbara Stoles. Phantasies of Love-thief: Caurapancasika Attributed to Bilhana (Columbia Univ. Press, 1971). And Bhartrihari and Bilhana (The Hermit and The Love–Thief) Penguin 1990.
John T. Roberts, Caurapancasika, English and Sanskrit. The Thief, His Fifty Verses: Bilhana's Caurapancasika, The Northern Recension, with word by word grammatical notes and translations. (Papercraft Print, 2000).  / 0967967716
Love Lyrics by Amaru [and] Bhartṛhari ; translated by Greg Bailey ; & by Bilhaṇa ; edited and translated by Richard Gombrich published by The Clay Sanskrit Library New York University Press : JJC Foundation 2005 2005.
"Swan Song of the Thief" An adaptation of Bilhana’s Caurapâñcâśikâ by Dawn Corrigan a free interpretation online magazine otisnebula.com 2013
The Caurapâñcâśikâ (The Love-Thief) Poetic rendering into English 2013

Sanskrit poetry
11th-century Indian books